The Action of Agagia (also Agagiya, Aqqaqia or Aqaqia) took place east of Sidi Barrani in Egypt on 26 February 1916, during the Senussi Campaign between German and Ottoman-instigated Senussi forces and the British army in Egypt. On 11 December 1915, a British column had been attacked at Duwwar Hussein along the Matruh–Sollum track. In the Affair of Wadi Senba, the Senussi were defeated and two days later a Senussi attack at Wadi Hasheifiat was repulsed. The British returned to Matruh until 25 December, then surprised the Senussi at the Affair of Wadi Majid but the Senussi got away. At the Affair of Halazin on 23 January, the Senussi were defeated and again slipped away.

In February 1916, the Western Frontier Force (Major-General William Peyton), was reinforced and a British column advanced west along the coast, to re-capture Sollum in February; en route, a Senussi encampment at Agagiya was spotted by aircraft. On 26 February, the column attacked the Senussi at Agagiya and captured Jaafar Pasha, commander of the Senussi forces on the coast. As the Senussi retreated, they were cut off by a Dorset Yeomanry cavalry charge; the Yeomen lost half their horses and about a third of their riders but dispersed the column, caused about  took  captured the Senussi baggage train and pursued the survivors into the desert. Sollum was re-occupied by the British on 14 March 1916, which ended the coastal campaign.

Background

Senussi
The Senussi were a religious sect mainly of Libyan nomads, who had fought the Italians in Libya during the Italo-Turkish War (29 September 1911 – 18 October 1912). Britain declared war on the Ottoman Empire on 5 November 1914 and in the summer of 1915, Turkish envoys, including Nuri Bey, brother of Enver Pasha and Jaafar Pasha, negotiated an agreement with the Grand Senussi, Sayyid Ahmed ash-Sharif, to attack the British in Egypt from the west, during the Ottoman offensive through Palestine against the Suez Canal, known as the Raid on the Suez Canal.

By late 1915, many of the British forces in Egypt had been sent to Gallipoli and Mesopotamia, leaving western Egypt garrisoned by the Egyptian coastguard. The Ottomans and Germans delivered modern weapons by submarine to the Senussi. German and Turkish officers were also transported by submarine and landed on 19 May 1915 to the west of Sollum and set up headquarters at Siwa. The Senussi crossed the Libyan–Egyptian border on 21 November 1915 to begin the coastal campaign.

Western Frontier Force

The Western Frontier Force (WFF, Major-General Alexander Wallace), comprised the 1/6th Royal Scots, 2/7th and 2/8th Middlesex, Territorial infantry battalions, the 15th Sikhs, three cavalry regiments raised from rear details of yeomanry and units of the Australian Light Horse, who fought at Gallipoli as infantry, Royal Naval Air Service (RNAS) armoured cars, the 1/1st Nottinghamshire Royal Horse Artillery (RHA) and two aircraft of 17 Squadron Royal Flying Corps (RFC). Wallace suffered from an old wound and was relieved by Major-General William Peyton and the WFF was reinforced with the 1st South African Brigade (Brigadier-General Henry Lukin) and a detachment of Egyptian engineers on 4 February. The WFF eventually received  which made the force capable of advancing a greater distance and the ability to maintain itself in the desert.

Coastal campaign

On 6 November 1915,  sank  and the coastguard gun-boat Abbas, and badly damaged Nur el Bahr in the Bay of Sollum. On 11 December, a British column at Duwwar Hussein was attacked along the Matruh–Sollum track and in the Affair of Wadi Senba, drove the Senussi out of the wadi.

The reconnaissance continued and on 13 December, at Wadi Hasheifiat the British were attacked again and after a delay, forced the Senussi to retreat. The British returned to Matruh until 25 December then made a night advance to surprise the Senussi. At the Affair of Wadi Majid, the Senussi were defeated again but were able to withdraw to the west. Air reconnaissance found more Senussi encampments at Halazin, which was attacked on 23 January in the Affair of Halazin. The Senussi fell back skilfully and then attempted to envelop the British, who were pushed back on the flanks as the centre advanced and defeated the main body of Senussi, who were again able to withdraw.

Prelude

British preparations
The WFF advanced along the coast from Mersa Matruh to Sidi Barrani, to re-capture Sollum on the Libyan–Egyptian frontier but as a deception it was rumoured that the WFF was about to retreat from Mersa Matruh. On 20 February, Lukin advanced towards Unjeila with orders to reach Sidi Barrani quickly, with the 1st and 3rd South African Infantry battalions, the Dorset Yeomanry, Bucks Hussars, 6th Royal Scots, most of the Notts Battery of the 1/1st Nottinghamshire RHA and a field ambulance. The force arrived on 22 February and local Bedouin reported that Nuri and Jaafar were at Agagia. Lukin planned to rest the force on 25 February and then make a night advance, to attack the Senussi encampment at dawn.

Senussi preparations
The guns were silenced by the British artillery and the Senussi were driven off; expecting more attacks, Lukin abandoned the night march. An attack from the north would have to advance over ground offering no cover.

Battle

Lukin received the yeomanry report and at  advanced from the camp and sent the Dorset Yeomanry (Lieutenant-Colonel H. M. W. Souter) to cut off the Senussi retreat. The yeomanry moved round to the west of the Senussi position to some sand hills, from which the Senussi could be observed. The yeomanry dismounted and assisted by covering fire from two armoured cars, which inhibited Senussi machine-gun fire, advanced to pin down the Senussi. The infantry advanced with the 3rd South African Battalion forward and the 1st South African Battalion in support. By  the troops had moved , deployed and at  came under fire. The battalion advanced in line with the men at two-pace intervals, machine-guns on the flanks and covering fire from the Notts Battery. The Senussi replied with artillery, machine-guns and rifles, from covered positions invisible to the South Africans. Losses mounted as the advance closed up to the sand hills and Jaafar sent a counter-attack against the South African left flank. A company of the 1st South African Battalion moved to the flank and repulsed the attack, at which Lukin ordered a general attack.

The infantry rushed the Senussi front line on the fringe of the sand hills and then had a running fight as the Senussi retreated through the dunes, delaying the South African advance to the southern end of the sand hills until  when the South Africans found that the Senussi had gone. The column was protected by Bedouin and  armed with machine guns, which formed flank- and rear-guards. The yeomanry dismounted to rest its horses and study the ground, which had a slight rise towards the Senussi column.

After resting, the yeomanry attacked in two lines at a steady gallop, receiving return fire from the Senussi, which was accurate at first, became wilder and then ceased. Souter was shot off his horse and fell near Jaafar and the attackers hesitated but the machine-gun section arrived and continued the rout. Jaafar and two Ottoman officers were captured and a pursuit was conducted into the desert, where "considerable numbers" of Senussi were killed with swords. In the aftermath,  were taken, the Senussi tents were burned and camels rounded up.

Aftermath

Analysis

After burying the dead and resting the survivors, Lukin advanced to Sidi Barrani and entered unopposed on 28 February. Jaafar Pasha was taken to Cairo and having been deprived of his leadership, the Senussi revolt collapsed. The Senussi never again withstood a British attack and although the campaign lasted for several more months, desert conditions were more of an obstacle to British operations than Senussi resistance.

Casualties
British casualties were  the Dorset Yeomanry losing  and

Footnotes

References

Further reading

External links

 Bridport News: Queen’s Own Dorset Yeomanry led charge at battle of Agagia
 The Western Campaign/Agagia Campaign 1915

Agagia
Agagia
Agagia
Agagia
Battles of the African Theatre (World War I)
Conflicts in 1916
1916 in Egypt
February 1916 events